The 2006–07 season was East Bengal's 11th season in the National Football League and 87th season in existence.

Competitions

Overall

Overview

Calcutta Football League

East Bengal finished the 2006 Calcutta Premier Division as the champions with 32 points from 14 matches. Captain Alvito D'Cunha scored the solitary goal in the final game against Eastern Railway to win back the Calcutta League title after losing out the previous year to arch-rivals Mohun Bagan.

Fixtures & results

Durand Cup

Group B

East Bengal was grouped alongside JCT, Dempo and Army XI in Group B. East Bengal drew 0–0 against Dempo in the opening fixture but 0–4 against JCT and 1–2 against Army XI as they were eliminated from the group stages.

Fixtures & results

IFA Shield

Group A

East Bengal was grouped alongside Mahindra United and Sporting Club de Goa in Group A. East Bengal lost 1–0 against Sporting Club de Goa in the opening game and drew 1–1 against Mahindra United as they were eliminated from the group stages.

Fixtures & results

Federation Cup

East Bengal started the Federation Cup campaign in the Pre-Quarter Finals against State Bank of Travancore and won 2–0 with goals from Syed Rahim Nabi and Alvito D'Cunha. In the quarter-final, however, East Bengal lost 0–1 against Dempo courtesy of a solitary strike from Ranti Martins in the 86th minute as they were eliminated from the competition.

Fixtures & results

National Football League

League table

Fixtures & results

Super Soccer Series 2007 (Friendly)

Brazilian giants São Paulo football club toured India for a series of friendly matches in January 2007. East Bengal played them on 27 January 2007 at the Kanchenjunga Stadium in Siliguri and lost 0–3 with goals from Carlinhos, Paulo Matos and Jean Raphael Moreira.

Fixtures & results

Statistics

Appearances
Only for competitive fixtures.
Players with no appearances are not included in the list.

Goal scorers

References

East Bengal Club seasons